Dyson's transform is a fundamental technique in additive number theory. It was developed by Freeman Dyson as part of his proof of Mann's theorem, is used to prove such fundamental results of Additive Number Theory as the Cauchy-Davenport theorem, and was used by Olivier Ramaré in his work on the Goldbach conjecture that proved that every even integer is the sum of at most 6 primes. The term Dyson's transform for this technique is used by Ramaré. Halberstam and Roth call it the τ-transformation.

This formulation of the transform is from Ramaré. Let A be a sequence of natural numbers, and x be any real number. Write A(x) for the number of elements of A which lie in [1, x]. We write A + B for the sumset, that is, the set of all elements a + b where a is in A and b is in B; and similarly A − B for the set of differences a − b. The transformed sequences have the properties:

References

Sumsets
Freeman Dyson